EFG Bank European Financial Group SA is a bank based in Geneva, Switzerland, authorised and supervised by the Swiss FINMA and specialising in classical private banking services. It owns ca. 44% of EFG International, a global private banking group headquartered in Zurich, Switzerland, and listed on the SIX Swiss Exchange (EFGN), specialising in private banking and asset management.

External links
 http://www.efggroup.com/

See also

 EFG International

Banks of Switzerland
Companies based in Geneva